The Synagogue des Tournelles is an orthodox Jewish synagogue in the Marais district of Paris. It was dedicated on 15 September 1876, which coincided with Jewish New Year celebrations in the month of Tishri.

The synagogue is built in Roman-Byzantine style, and has been described as an architectural gem. The internal metallic framework is visible and was created by architect Gustave Eiffel.

The original congregation was mostly French Jews from the Alsace and Lorraine regions of eastern France. They were joined later by immigrants from Poland, Russia, and other countries of central Europe.

In 1941, the synagogue was attacked as one of Paris synagogue attacks planned by the far-right Revolutionary Social Movement.

References 

Synagogues in Paris